The La Salle Coliseum (also called the USLS Coliseum) is an indoor sporting arena located in Bacolod, Philippines.

The Coliseum has played host to a number of basketball games including those of Philippine Basketball Association out of town games and the now-defunct Metropolitan Basketball Association, where it served as the home court of the Negros Slashers.

It is the largest indoor facility in Negros Island Region. It is located inside the campus of the University of St. La Salle and hosts sporting and entertainment events in the province.

Negros Occidental Private Schools Sports Cultural Educational Association (NOPSSCEA) sports opening ceremony are usually held in the coliseum
and was the official venue during the 2005 Southeast Asian Games particularly the Boxing event where 11 countries participated the competition. The coliseum also hosted two major karatedo championships, the 1996 Philippine Karatedo Federation National Championship headed by Pocholo Veguillas and Cristina Ramos-Jalasco, former Philippine Olympic Committee chairman and daughter of former president Fidel V. Ramos and the 2007 20th PKF National Open. Both tournaments were held at the USLS Coliseum. The tournaments were contested by hundreds of karatekas all over the country.

References

Indoor arenas in the Philippines
Basketball venues in the Philippines
Boxing venues in the Philippines
Buildings and structures in Bacolod
Sports in Negros Occidental
University of St. La Salle